The Ministry of Digital Affairs is a cabinet-level governmental body of the Republic of China (Taiwan), in charge of all policy and regulation of information, telecommunications, communications, information security, and the internet in Taiwan.

Background
Following the passage of an amendment to the Organizational Act of the Executive Yuan in 2010, the number of agencies within the Executive Yuan was to be reduced from 37 to 29. This included the transfer of some duties from the Ministry of Transportation and Communications and the National Communications Commission to what would become the Ministry of Digital Affairs. The Ministry of Digital Affairs assumed oversight of select portfolios from the Ministry of Economic Affairs and the Executive Yuan's Department of Cyber Security as well. These included government information security, digital services and data management, alongside the development of industries related to the digital economy. The digital ministry's duties were to integrate and develop policy for telecommunication, information, cybersecurity, the Internet and communication industries. The agency was also responsible for maintenance and management of digital resources and infrastructure, and expected to foster a positive environment for the development of new technologies.

The Executive Yuan declared the founding of a digital development ministry a legislative priority in February 2021. By March, assorted amendments had been proposed for legislative review and minister without portfolio Kuo Yau-hwang was selected convenor of the digital ministry's preparatory office. The Legislative Yuan approbated the establishment of the Ministry of Digital Affairs by passing an amendment to the National Communications Commission Organization Act and approving the Organization Act of the Ministry of Digital Affairs in December 2021. By March 2022, Kuo Yau-hwang had been replaced by Audrey Tang. She was heavily involved in setting up the Ministry of Digital Affairs, and was duly appointed the agency's founding minister. The Ministry of Digital Affairs was inaugurated on 27 August 2022. The Organization Act for the Ministry of Digital Affairs limits the ministry to 598 employees.

Organization
The ministry is headed by a minister, two political deputy ministers, one administrative deputy minister, and one chief secretary.

Implementation units
 Department of Digital Strategy
 Department of Communications and Cyber Resilience
 Department of Resource Management
 Department of Digital Service
 Department of Democracy Network
 Department of Plural Innovation

Subordinate agencies and non-departmental public bodies
 Administration for Cyber Security
 Administration for Digital Industries
 Institute for Information Industry
 Telecom Technology Center
 Taiwan Network Information Center
 National Institute for Cyber Security

List of Ministers

Political Party:

References

External links

 Organization Act of the Ministry of Digital Affairs, Organization Act of the Administration for Digital Industries, Ministry of Digital Affairs, Organization Act of the Administration for Cyber Security, Ministry of Digital Affairs provided by the Ministry of Justice.
Digi+ Taiwan

Executive Yuan
Ministries established in 2022
2022 establishments in Taiwan
Taiwan
Information ministries